The Boston mayoral election of 1890 saw the election of Nathan Matthews Jr. Incumbent Mayor Thomas N. Hart was defeated for the Republican nomination by Moody Merrill.

Results

See also
List of mayors of Boston, Massachusetts

References

Mayoral elections in Boston
Boston
Boston mayoral
19th century in Boston